The 1939 Hong Kong Urban Council election was supposed to be held on 2 February 1939 for the one of the two unofficial seats in the Urban Council of Hong Kong.

Dr. Chau Sik-nin held his seat without being contested.

References
 Endacott, G. B. Government and people in Hong Kong, 1841-1962 : a constitutional history Hong Kong University Press. (1964) 
 The Hong Kong Government Gazette

Hong Kong
1939 in Hong Kong
Urban
Uncontested elections
February 1939 events
1939 elections in the British Empire